The  Detroit Lions season was their 29th in the National Football League (NFL). The defending NFL champions failed to improve on their previous season and finished at 4–7–1, fifth in the six-team Western Conference.

Hall of Fame quarterback Bobby Layne, age 31, was traded after the second game to the Pittsburgh Steelers for Earl Morrall and two draft choices. This supposedly led to Layne "cursing" the Lions, allegedly saying that Detroit "would not win for fifty years." The story is considered a hoax, as no contemporaneous account exists and Layne himself denied saying it. (Real or not, the "curse" bedeviled the Lions franchise for the next half-century, and beyond: as of 2021, 63 years after the trade, Detroit has not won another championship, and indeed has won only a single playoff contest in that time.) Meanwhile, after losing their first two games without Layne, the Steelers finished at 7–4–1, their best record in over a decade.

The Lions won only one game in the first half of the season (1–4–1), then spilt the final six games; one of the poorest performances by a defending league champion in NFL history. The preseason began on a sour note in mid-August as they lost 35–19 to the 14-point underdog College All-Stars at Soldier Field in Chicago, closing the margin with a late touchdown.

Schedule 

 Thursday (November 27: Thanksgiving)

Game summaries

Week 10

Standings

References 

Detroit Lions seasons
Detroit Lions
Detroit Lions